Majid Nasseri Khorram (born 23 August 1968) is an Iranian former cyclist. He competed in two events at the 1992 Summer Olympics. He also worked as the national team coach.

References

External links
 

1968 births
Living people
Iranian male cyclists
Olympic cyclists of Iran
Cyclists at the 1992 Summer Olympics
Place of birth missing (living people)
Cyclists at the 1994 Asian Games
Cyclists at the 1998 Asian Games
Asian Games competitors for Iran
20th-century Iranian people